Notsodipus is a genus of Australian white tailed spiders that was first described by Norman I. Platnick in 2000.

Species
 it contains eighteen species:
Notsodipus barlee Platnick, 2000 – Australia (Western Australia)
Notsodipus bidgemia Platnick, 2000 – Australia (Western Australia)
Notsodipus blackall Platnick, 2000 – Australia (Queensland)
Notsodipus broadwater Platnick, 2000 – Australia (Queensland)
Notsodipus capensis Platnick, 2000 – Australia (Western Australia)
Notsodipus dalby Platnick, 2000 (type) – Eastern Australia
Notsodipus domain Platnick, 2000 – Southern Australia, Tasmania
Notsodipus innot Platnick, 2000 – Australia (Queensland)
Notsodipus keilira Platnick, 2000 – Australia (South Australia, Victoria)
Notsodipus linnaei Platnick & Dupérré, 2008 – Australia (Western Australia)
Notsodipus magdala Platnick, 2000 – Australia (Northern Territory)
Notsodipus marun Platnick, 2000 – Australia (Western Australia, Northern Territory, Queensland)
Notsodipus meedo Platnick, 2000 – Australia (Western Australia)
Notsodipus muckera Platnick, 2000 – Southern Australia
Notsodipus quobba Platnick, 2000 – Australia (Western Australia)
Notsodipus renmark Platnick, 2000 – Australia (South Australia, Victoria)
Notsodipus upstart Platnick, 2000 – Australia (Queensland)
Notsodipus visio Platnick, 2000 – Australia (Western Australia, South Australia)

See also
 List of Lamponidae species

References

Araneomorphae genera
Lamponidae
Spiders of Australia